The Minnesota History Center is a museum and library that serves as the headquarters of the Minnesota Historical Society. It is near downtown Saint Paul, Minnesota, and is considered one of Minnesota's finest public buildings.

The History Center is on Kellogg Boulevard, between the Mississippi River and the Minnesota State Capitol. Before this building was built in 1992, the Minnesota Historical Society (MNHS) occupied what is now the Minnesota Judicial Center, originally built for the Society in 1917. Before that, MNHS was housed in the basement of the State Capitol.

The center hosts concerts, dance performances, lectures, conferences, meetings, dinners, political campaign events, memorial services, receptions, parties, and weddings; as many as 75,000 schoolchildren visit the History Center every year.

Architecture 

The Minneapolis architectural firm of Hammel Green and Abrahamson (HGA) designed the History Center's floor plan and exterior. HGA looked to Fort Snelling, the St. Paul's Cathedral and the Minnesota State Capitol for inspiration. One member of the History Center Planning Committee said, "We have envisioned a place that draws the public in, fires the imagination, and responds to its hunger for an understanding of the past. We have envisioned a building alive with people from morning until far into the evening...a vital cultural and educational center."

After ten years of planning and nearly three years of construction, The History Center opened in October 1992. The building features a central dome with two bordering wings, creating an L-shaped design. The north facade faces the Capitol, and the southeast facade overlooks a large lawn and terrace area. Bronze doors admit visitors into the center's main entrance, on the west wall.

The construction budget for the History Center included funds from a Percent for Art program that included three integrated artworks: Charm Bracelet lies on the floor of the first-story rotunda. This project, sculpted by James Casebere, depicts a broken piece of jewelry in which each of ten "charms" represents an important aspect of Minnesota: a tractor (agriculture); a printer's ink roller (civic society and free speech); a tepee (the Dakota tribe); a mill building (lumbering and flour-milling); a house (family); a power plant (technology and industry); a turtle, bear and fish (nature, outdoor recreation, and Ojibwe totems of healing, defense and learning); and a whooping crane (lost wilderness and a metaphor for history). The entrance of the History Center includes glass etchings by Brit Bunkley above the John Ireland and Kellogg Boulevard entrances and the courtyard doors. He created a "system of icons" of sandblasted panels with multidimensional iconic imagery deeply etched onto the thick glass surfaces. Andrew Leicester created Minnesota Profiles, terra cotta columns "marking the edge of where Summit Avenue once crossed what is today’s History Center courtyard". Each column represents a native tree that also include sculpted profiles of 140 volunteers.

The museum showcases interactive in-house-developed and traveling exhibits, as well as historical programming and lectures.

More than half of the  building is underground, much of which is used for storage. The Minnesota History Center possesses over 1 million artifacts, including archaeological objects, books, photographs, maps, paintings, prints, drawings, manuscripts, government records, newspapers and periodicals. In this storage space, the shelves reach heights over 25 feet. The center also has a conservation laboratory, where conservators repair, stabilize, and maintain the Society's thousands of valuable objects.

Gale Family Library 
The Gale Family Library on the second floor of the History Center offers resources for MNHS members and guests. Two rooms, the Weyerhaeuser Reference Room and the Ronald M. Hubbs Microfilm Reading Room, make up the library area. The library often hosts classes on historical and genealogical research.

References
Citations

Works cited

External links
 
 
 "Hubert Humphrey, Presidential Contender" from C-SPAN's The Contenders, broadcast from the Minnesota History Center

History centers
History museums in Minnesota
Minnesota Historical Society
Museums established in 1993
Museums in Saint Paul, Minnesota